Arasatchi is a 2004 Indian Tamil-language vigilante film directed by N. Maharajan, starring Arjun and Lara Dutta, alongside an ensemble cast. This is the Tamil debut of Dutta. The film was released on 17 September 2004.

Plot 
Brammanadham (Anandaraj), a lawyer who argues for rapists and murderers, is killed by a cricket ball hit by Siddharth (Arjun). Siddharth is a GM of a five-star hotel owned by S. Ve. Shekher. Shekher's daughter is Lara (Lara Dutta), who is introduced with a song. She comes from abroad to join her father's hotel, but only as a trainee under the macho Siddharth. Within no time, Lara is in love with Siddharth.

It is now time for duets. Lara's friend Prakash (Karan) is a campaigner of public cause. His efforts lead to a brothel raid and a minister getting arrested. The minister's goons bump off Prakash, and Siddharth is an eyewitness. Siddharth refuses to testify, and Lara walks out on him. Janakiraman (Charan Raj) pleads for the killer and lets him off. Siddharth bumps off Janakiraman. Major Vishwanath (Nassar), a military officer, is a witness to the murder. He even postpones his heart operation until the killer is nabbed. Siddharth now tells his story of why he is on a hunt of the lawyers who plead for the bad guys. Vishwanath gives up his mission.

Next, Karunakaran (Devan) takes a brief for a rapist, and he too is killed. Next is the turn of advocate Ashok Mehta (Raghuvaran), who comes from Delhi. The surprise element is that Ashok is Siddharth's brother-in-law; Ashok's wife is Siddharth's long-lost sister. Now, the brother-sister sentiment comes into play.

Finally, the story ends with Ashok being shot dead by Siddharth in the court premises. The police opens fire, and bystanders form a human wall and get shot at. Siddharth tells the TV crew about how his mission has spread to the masses.

Cast 

 Arjun as Siddharth
 Lara Dutta as Lara
 Vivek as Hotel Assistant Manager
 S. Ve. Shekher as Lara's father
 Karan as Prakash
 Vindhya as Menaka, Prakash's wife
 Nassar as Major Vishwanath
 Raghuvaran as Ashok Mehta (Siddharth's brother-in-law)
 Anandaraj as Advocate Brammanadham
 Charan Raj as Advocate Janakiraman
 P. Vasu as Saravanaperumal, Siddharth's father
 Kavitha as Lakshmi, Siddharth's mother
 Abitha as Swetha, Siddharth's sister
 Manivannan as Hotel Receptionist
 Devan as Karunakaran
 Rajan P. Dev as Contractor Muthupandi
 Mansoor Ali Khan as Inspector India Ganesan
 Ajay Rathnam as Inspector Karthikeyan
 Vaiyapuri as Soosai
 M. N. Nambiar as Poojaari
 Ponnambalam as Muthupandi's henchman
 Uma as Gayathri
 Delhi Ganesh as Sivaraman
 Mahanadi Shankar as Goon
 Bose Venkat
 Dhamu
 Riya Sen as Bar Dancer in item song (Iruvadhu Vayasu)
 Perarasu as reporter (uncredited)

Production 
After the success of Vallarasu, Maharajan was supposed to direct Vijayakanth in another project but later got dropped and Maharajan went on to remake Vallarasu in Hindi as Indian with Sunny Deol. Meanwhile, Maharajan announced his next project Arasatchi with Arjun playing the lead role. Miss Universe 2000 Lara Dutta made her acting debut in Tamil with this film. The filming was held at Le Royal Meridian Hotel, Chennai, and the songs were picturised at locations in London, New Zealand and Canada.

During the making of the film, music composer Harris Jayaraj fell out with the director. The film was completed in 2003 but got delayed due to financial problems and finally released in 2004; in between production delays, Maharajan finished Anjaneya with Ajith.

Controversy 
Before release, a poster featuring the tagline "When Justice Fails" created controversy, which caused a lawyer to file a case citing that the film would portray lawyers in bad light. However the case was sorted after the high court dismissed the petition.

Soundtrack 
The music was composed by Harris Jayaraj.

Reception 
Malini Mannath wrote for Chennai Online, "A knot had potential and would have been ideal for the 'action king' if only the screenplay had been etched more carefully, the narration tightened, with more 'action' given to Arjun than to factors like tanker-blasts, etc." Sify wrote, "Arjun does his usual song and fights convincingly while Lara Dutta is too loud and is there only for glamour and songs. The film looks out-dated as it has been years in the making". Visual Dasan of Kalki called the film "above average".

References

External links 
 

2000s Tamil-language films
2004 films
Films scored by Harris Jayaraj
Films set in India
Films shot in Canada
Films shot in Chennai
Films shot in London
Films shot in New Zealand